Serbino is a rural locality (a village) in Plyussky District of Pskov Oblast, Russia.

Rural localities in Pskov Oblast